Abram S. Hewitt State Forest is a state forest by Hewitt in northwestern New Jersey that is  . It is on the Bearfort Ridge of unusual conglomerate between Greenwood Lake and Upper Greenwood Lake. Its forests are part of the Northeastern coastal forests ecoregion. It has a number of overlooks and colorful bedrock. It is accessible only on foot, with trails including the Bearfort Trail,  and white-blazed. Another trail is the  Quail trail,  and orange-blazed. Another is the Ernest Walter trail,  and yellow-blazed. Also, the  State Line trail is blazed with blue on white. Lastly, the Appalachian Trail traverses the forest's northwest corner along its route.

See also

 List of New Jersey state parks

References

Hewitt State Forest
Hewitt State Forest
State forests of the Appalachians